"I Do Love You" is a song written and performed by Billy Stewart. It reached #6 on the U.S. R&B chart and #26 on the Billboard Hot 100 in 1965. It was featured on his 1965 album, I Do Love You.

Arrangement was by Phil Wright.

Stewart re-released the song as a single in 1969 which reached #94 on the Billboard Hot 100.

The sound is loosely based around the last 30 seconds of The Impressions track, "I've Been Trying" from their 1964 album "Keep On Pushing"

GQ version
GQ released a version as a single in July 1979 which reached #5 on the U.S. R&B chart and #20 on the Billboard Hot 100.  It was featured on their 1979 album, Disco Nights.

The single ranked #99 on the Billboard Year-End Hot 100 singles of 1979.

The song is featured on 2001 film Baby Boy.

Warren G sampled GQ's version on the song "Relax Ya Mind" from his 1997 album, Take a Look Over Your Shoulder.

Other versions
Barbara Mason, on her 1968 album, Oh How It Hurts.
Jackie Edwards, as a single in 1972 in the UK, but it did not chart.
The Heptones, as a single in 1972, but it did not chart.
Janet Kay, as a single in 1980 in the UK, but it did not chart.

References

1965 songs
1965 singles
1972 singles
1979 singles
Billy Stewart songs
Songs written by Billy Stewart
GQ (band) songs
Chess Records singles
Arista Records singles
United Artists Records singles